Committees of the Oireachtas are committees and sub-committees and select committees of Dáil Éireann and Joint Committees of Dáil Éireann and Seanad Éireann, that are small groups of TDs and senators of the Oireachtas, the parliament of the Republic of Ireland. Some committees are formed by statute after every general election, others are formed by agreement for a full parliamentary term or for a specific issue on a time-limited basis. Committees are formed on a proportional basis from members of the political parties/groups in each house. Chairs of committees are granted a stipend for their work. Some committees scrutinise the work and proposed legislation from specific government departments, and senior ministers or junior ministers of state as well as public servants or representatives of semi-state bodies and organisations supported by state funding are also regularly invited to address such committees.

Private meetings
Committees agree their agendas and ways of working, or discuss matters of a sensitive nature, in private meetings.

Public meetings
Committees hold public meetings where individuals are asked to address a committee, or be questioned by it.

Parliamentary privilege
Per Bunreacht na hÉireann, when addressing a committee in Leinster House, contributors are protected by limited parliamentary privilege, but it is the custom of committees to ask contributors to desist from referring (directly or undeniably) negatively to individuals who are not present at such a committee meeting.

Committee of Privileges
The Constitution provides for the formation, at the direction of the president, following a request of 30 senators, of a joint "Committee of Privileges", to decide on whether a specific Bill meets the definition of a "money bill", which would be subject to a maximum delay of 21 days by a Seanad resolution. This committee would be chaired by a Supreme Court Judge.

Proposed constitutional change 2011
The Thirtieth Amendment of the Constitution Bill 2011, put to a referendum in October 2011, sought to empower each House to convene (possibly jointly) committees of inquiry, with powers to compel withness statements, and to make findings against citizens. The referendum was defeated by 53% to 47%. In 2013 a referendum to remove the Seanad proposed extensive changes of committees. This was defeated by 51.7% to 48.3%.

Current committees

Dáil committees
 Public Accounts Committee

Joint committees
 Joint Committee on Agriculture, Food and the Marine
 Joint Committee on European Union Affairs
 Joint Committee on Social Protection, Community and Rural Development and the Islands
 Joint Committee on Health
 Joint Committee on Transport and Communications
 Joint Committee on Gender Equality
 Joint Committee on Disability Matters
 Joint Committee on International Surrogacy
  - (Joint Committee on The Irish Language, The Gaeltachts and the Use of Irish in Public)
  Select Committee on Education and Further And Higher Education, Research, Innovation And Science
 Joint Committee on the Implementation of The Good Friday Agreement

Former committees

 Joint Committee on Women's Rights
 Joint Committee on Marriage Breakdown
 Joint Committee on Tourism, Sport and Recreation
 Joint Committee on the Irish language
 Joint Committee on the Secondary Legislation of the European Communities
 Committee of Inquiry into the Banking Crisis, (post-2008)
 Joint Committee on Health and Children
 Joint Committee on Foreign Affairs and Trade
 Joint Committee on the Eighth Amendment of the Constitution (32nd Dáil)
 Joint Committee on Justice and Equality

References

External links

Oireachtas
Oireachtas